Love Bites is the second studio album by English punk rock band Buzzcocks. It was released on 22 September 1978, through United Artists Records.

The album peaked at number 13 on the UK Albums Chart at the time of its release, making Love Bites their highest-charting album.

Background and production
Love Bites was recorded and mixed by Buzzcocks with producer Martin Rushent over a two-and-a-half-week period in July and August 1978, less than six months after the release of their début album, Another Music in a Different Kitchen. The album was recorded in the midst of an extensive touring schedule.

The instrumental track "Late for the Train" was first played and recorded on John Peel's Radio One show, along with bass player Steve Garvey's instrumental "Walking Distance".

Co-writing credits for "Just Lust" were given to Alan Dial, a pen-name for Buzzcocks' then manager Richard Boon.

"Nostalgia" was also recorded by Newcastle band Penetration, who in 1978 accompanied Buzzcocks on the "Entertaining Friends" tour of England.

Cover artwork
The hand-drawn script on the album sleeve is a conscious reference to paintings by Belgian surrealist artist René Magritte. The sleeve insert airbrush illustrations of the band are by Robin Utracik, rhythm guitarist from The Worst.

Critical reception 

Trouser Press wrote that the record "demonstrates both the Buzzcocks' perfection of their particular brand of pop and their disillusionment with its restrictions. Producer Martin Rushent clarifies the elements of the sound even further, and Shelley's songwriting continues to improve".

In a retrospective review, BBC Music described it as "an essential purchase for anyone remotely interested in punk's history." AllMusic wrote: "More musically accomplished, more obsessively self-questioning, and with equally energetic yet sometimes gloomy performances, Love Bites finds the Buzzcocks coming into their own."

CD release
In March 1994, a CD version of the original album was released by EMI, containing four additional tracks: "Love You More"; "Noise Annoys"; "Promises"; and "Lipstick".

Track listing

Personnel
Buzzcocks
 Pete Shelley – lead guitar, lead vocals (all but 8)
 Steve Diggle – rhythm and acoustic guitars, backing and lead (8) vocals
 Steve Garvey – bass guitar
 John Maher – drums

Production
 Martin Rushent – engineering, mixing
 Douglas Bennett – engineering

Notes

References

External links
 
 PopMatters review of Love Bites

1978 albums
Buzzcocks albums
Albums produced by Martin Rushent
I.R.S. Records albums
Nettwerk Records albums
Parlophone albums
United Artists Records albums
albums recorded at Olympic Sound Studios